Hepatic hydrothorax is a rare form of pleural effusion that occurs in people with liver cirrhosis. It is defined as an effusion of over 500 mL in people with liver cirrhosis that is not caused by heart, lung, or pleural disease. It is found in 5-10% of people with liver cirrhosis and 2-3% of people with pleural effusions. It is much more common on the right side, with 85% of cases occurring on the right, 13% on the left, and 2% in both. Although it is most common in people with severe ascites, cases have been reported where people only had mild or no ascites. Symptoms are not specific, and mostly involve the respiratory system.

The condition is diagnosed based on the existence of liver cirrhosis and fluid build-up in the abdomen (ascites) and analysis of the fluid. The fluid has a low protein content. Mainly, the condition is treated by medical management, such as diet adjustment and usage of diuretics. In cases that do not respond, known as refractory cases, the condition is treated with a transjugular intrahepatic portosystemic shunt (TIPS). The only curative treatment is a liver transplant. Prognosis is usually poor.

Symptoms 
There are no specific symptoms, because it generally occurs with ascites and other manifestations of increased pressure in the portal vein caused by liver disease. Pleural fluid can far more easily cause symptoms than ascitic fluid, due to the lower volume of the pleural cavity as compared to the abdominal cavity. The main symptoms are usually related to the symptoms of liver cirrhosis and ascites. Less often, it may be the only manifestation of chronic liver disease. The symptoms depend on many factors, such as the effusion's volume, rate of accumulation, and the co-existence of cardiopulmonary disease. The disease may cause no symptoms and be incidentally detected by medical scans, or it may cause large pleural effusions that result in respiratory symptoms like cough, shortness of breath, low blood oxygen, and respiratory failure. Most people have progressive difficulty breathing and reduced tolerance for exercise. Rarely, there may be acute cases that accumulate fluid rapidly and result in circulatory collapse. In some cases, the main symptoms of people with cirrhosis are respiratory and related to the effusion.

Mechanism 
The disease has no known precise, defined mechanism, but several have been proposed. They are similar to the mechanisms behind ascites in cases of portal hypertension. The most medically accepted mechanism is that low albumin levels in blood reduce osmotic pressure and increase pressure in the azygos vein, causing it to leak plasma into the pleural cavity. The most accepted theory is that fluid originating from ascites travels through defects in the diaphragm into the pleural cavity. These defects exist in the normal population. The defects are usually less than 1 cm and are more common of the right side. The tendency towards the right side could be due to the left side being more muscular and the right side being more tendinous due to the proximity to the liver. Through a microscope, they look like discontinuities in the bundles of collagen that make up the tendon part of the diaphragm. Visually, without a microscope, these defects are classified into 4 types. Type 1 shows no clear defect, type 2 shows as blebs in the diaphragm, type 3 shows as broken defects in the diaphragm, and type 4 shows as several gaps in the diaphragm. In hepatic hydrothorax, the pressure created by ascites and the thinning of the diaphragm caused by malnutrition in cirrhosis cause the defects to become larger. Blebs of peritoneum can herniate through these defects, and if they burst, a pleuroperitoneal communication is created. Fluid moves from the abdomen to the pleural cavity via a difference in pressure between the cavities. If the rate of fluid accumulation is greater than the rate of absorption by the pleural membranes, hepatic hydrothorax results.

Diagnosis 

The most noticeable symptoms are usually those of cirrhosis and portal hypertension. Most people have signs of end-stage liver disease. pleuroperitoneal communications. The main method of diagnosis is extracting the fluid via thoracentesis. After this, the fluid is analyzed for diagnosis and to help rule out other possible causes like infection or cancer. The fluid can be analyzed for serum, protein, albumin, lactate dehydrogenase, and cell count. The fluid is a transudate and similar to fluid found in ascites. There may be a higher protein and albumin content in hepatic hydrothorax due to the pleura absorbing the water. To rule out heart-related causes of pleural effusion, an echocardiogram can be performed. Pleuroperitoneal communications are best detected by peritoneal scintigraphy. In this procedure, radioactive tracer is injected via needle into ascitic fluid, a procedure known as paracentesis. After that, a gamma camera is used to take images, showing the tracer in the pleural cavity. Hydrothorax without ascites has been reported to occur in as many as 20% of people with cirrhosis, but only detected in 7% of cases via CT scan and ultrasound.

Management 
Management is focused on treating and preventing the relapse of ascites, as the main mechanism of the condition is ascitic fluid flowing through the diaphragm. Some cases respond to medical management. In up to 26% of cases, the condition does not respond to medical management, in which case it is known as a refractory hepatic hydrothorax. In these cases, the first treatment of choice is the insertion of a transjugular intrahepatic portosystemic shunt. The only curative treatment is a liver transplant.

Medical management 
Medical management is the first method of treatment. Although it is simple, cheap, and noninvasive, it has a high rate of failure and comes with a risk of acute kidney injury and kidney failure. Reducing sodium in the diet and usage of diuretics may help reduce ascites and stop the growth of the effusion. The goal of medical management is a low sodium diet of 70-90 mmol per day, and lose .5 kg/day in cases without edema, and 1 kg/day in cases with edema. In most cases, diet modification is not enough to achieve the goal. In these cases, diuretics are the next line of treatment. A distal agent and a loop diuretic can be used together to cause the kidneys to excrete least 120 mEq/day of sodium via urine. The amount of sodium excreted in urine is monitored before and during treatment to adjust diuretic dosage based on response.

Refractory hepatic hydrothorax 

In cases of refractory hepatic hydrothorax, the only definite treatment is a liver transplant. However, the majority of people with this condition are unsuitable for transplantation, and the majority of those that are die awaiting it. In these cases, other treatments can improve symptoms, increase survival, and, ideally, give time until a liver transplant in available. The first choice of treatment in refractory cases is the insertion of a transjugular intrahepatic portosystemic shunt (TIPS). TIPS is effective in 70-80% of cases. It decompresses the portal system, reducing portal hypertension and ascites. However, it does not improve the prognosis in cases with end-stage liver disease. Risk factors for death after placement of TIPS include a Child-Pugh score greater than or equal to 10, MELD score greater than 15, and higher creatinine levels. There is also a higher death rate if the disease does not respond to TIPS. Although there is limited information, it is estimated to have a success rate of 70-80%. The shunt can also cause liver failure in cases with serious liver dysfunction as it shunts blood away from the liver. Thoracentesis, though typically safe, only provides temporary benefit. It increases the risk of pneumothorax from 7.7% to 34.7%. Other possible complications may include pain, empyema, hemothorax, and subcutaneous emphysema. As a second resort, in cases where TIPS is contradicted, an indwelling pleural catheter (IPC) can be used. Pleurodesis is used as a last resort in cases without ascites or any other options. It can be used to repair any defects in the diaphragm. It has the disadvantage of requiring multiple procedures and general anesthesia. Complications may include empyema, sepsis, and septic shock. Chest tubes are not recommended, as it can result in loss of protein, infection, pneumothorax, hemothorax, and electrolyte imbalances. There can also be issues in removing them, as the fluid tends to return after the tube is shut.

Prognosis 
The prognosis is poor and the mortality rate is high. The median survival time for cases with this condition is 8–12 months. The pleural fluid can become infected, resulting in spontaneous bacterial pleuritis. It is underdiagnosed and has a high death rate.

Epidemiology 
The condition is found in 5-10% of cirrhosis and portal hypertension cases and 2-3% of all pleural effusions. It is most common in the presence of decompensated cirrhosis.

References 

Diseases of pleura